B shares are a special class of shares on the New York Stock Exchange.

Comparison with A shares
B shares carry a back-end load, whereas A shares carry a front-end load.

See also
Class B share
Class A share

New York Stock Exchange